The Bagalamukhi Temple, bankhandi is located on Kangra district of Himachal Pradesh, India. It is dedicated to the goddess Bagalamukhi, a devi of the Hindu religion and one of the ten Mahavidyas. She is associated with the colour yellow. she is also named as peethambara. She sits on golden throne having pillars decorated with various jewels and has three eyes, that symbolises that she can impart ultimate knowledge to the devotee.

History
The temple is popular at the time of the Navaratri festival. It is one of three in India noted historically as having shrines to Bagalamukhi, the others being in Datia and Nalkheda MP.

Architecture
The unique feature of the temple is the triad, with Bagalamukhi central, and as an aspect of Parvati, between Lakshmi and Saraswati.

Notes

Temples in Himachal pradesh
Durga temples
Mahavidyas